Andrei M. Shkel (born 1967 in Russia) is a Professor of Mechanical and Aerospace Engineering at the University of California, Irvine. He was named Fellow of the Institute of Electrical and Electronics Engineers (IEEE) in 2014 "for contributions to micromachined gyroscopes". He served as the President of the IEEE Sensors Council (2020-2021). In 2021, he was elected to National Academy of Inventors (NAI) Fellow status. He is currently the Editor-in-Chief of the IEEE Sensors Letters.

Education and career
Shkel was educated at the Moscow State University where in 1991 he got his diploma in applied mechanics. In 1997, he earned his Ph.D. in mechanical engineering from the University of Wisconsin–Madison and from 1997 to 1999 served as a postdoc at the University of California, Berkeley. Since 2000, Shkel is a faculty member at the University of California, Irvine, and from 2009 to 2013, he was on leave from academia serving as a Program Manager in the Microsystems Technology Office of the Defense Advanced Research Projects Agency (DARPA). Dr. Shkel has been on a number of editorial boards, most recently as Editor of IEEE/ASME Journal of Micro-Electro-Mechanical Systems (JMEMS), Editor of the Journal on Gyroscopy and Navigation,  and the founding chair of the IEEE International Symposium on Inertial Sensors and Systems (INERTIAL). Dr. Shkel has been also awarded in 2013 the Office of the Secretary of Defense Medal for Exceptional Public Service, the 2009 IEEE Sensors Council Technical Achievement Award, and the 2005 NSF CAREER award. His professional interests, reflected in over 300 publications, three books, and 42 U.S. Patents, include high performance inertial sensors, microelectromechanical systems (MEMS), and implantable vestibular prosthetics.

References

External links

20th-century births
Living people
Russian engineers
Moscow State University alumni
University of Wisconsin–Madison College of Engineering alumni
University of California, Irvine faculty
Fellow Members of the IEEE
Year of birth missing (living people)
Place of birth missing (living people)